John Erik Harrysson (born 7 October 1967) is a Swedish Olympic sailor. He finished 6th in the Laser event at the 1996 Summer Olympics and 17th in the 49er event at the 2000 Summer Olympics together with Patrik Sandström.

References

Swedish male sailors (sport)
Olympic sailors of Sweden
49er class sailors
Laser class sailors
Royal Gothenburg Yacht Club sailors
Sailors at the 1996 Summer Olympics – Laser
Sailors at the 2000 Summer Olympics – 49er
1967 births
Living people
Sportspeople from Lund
20th-century Swedish people